Ujjawal   versus State of Haryana   (2021) is a case where Punjab and Haryana High Court refused to provide protection to a same-sex couple to protect the "social fabric of the society".

Background 
Ujjawal and his partner were living together. The couple, facing threat to their life and liberty from Ujjawal's relatives, approached the Court seeking protection.

Judgement 
The court opined that "if such protection as claimed is granted, the entire social fabric of the society would get disturbed."  Thereby, dismissing the petition.

Criticism 
The judgement contradicts the precedents set by the apex court, Supreme Court of India. The Supreme Court has affirmed that the right to choose a partner is protected under Article 21 of the Indian Constitution, and the constitutional rights cannot be denied on the social moral grounds.

Right to choose a partner 
The judgement contradicts the past judgements of the Supreme Court. The Supreme Court has affirmed the right to choose a partner is part of the personal liberty protected under Article 21 of the Indian Constitution.

In a 2018 case, Shafin Jahan versus Asokan K.M. and others, the two-judge bench consisting of then Chief Justice Dipak Misra and Justice A.M. Khanwilkar ruled that "the right to marry a person of one’s choice is integral to Article 21 of the Constitution".  In their opinion, the judges noted that the social values and morals cannot be held above constitutionally guaranteed rights. In another 2018 case, Shakti Vahini v. Union of India, the three-judge bench extended to protect not just married couples, but also the unmarried couples from any threat of violence. In this case, Supreme Court had made it imperative for the authorities to provide security to the couples.
With the exception Ujjawal v. State of Haryana and Devu G v. State Of Kerala, the high courts have almost always ruled in favour of the queer couple in similar cases. Including the cases, where judgements were pronounced after the verdict on Ujjawal v. State of Haryana. In the case of Devu G v. State Of Kerala, the petitioners moved the supreme court which ordered the stay on Kerala High Court ruling.  

The Supreme Court, in the case of Deepika Singh v. Central Administrative Tribunal, ruled that "atypical families" are deserving of equal protection under law and benefits available under social welfare legislation.

Constitutional rights above social morality 
While decriminalizing homosexuality, the five-judge constitutional bench of Supreme Court highlighted the importance of "constitutional morality" over social morality. Whereas, Justice Anil Kshetarpal gave importance to the "social morality" in his ruling.

While ruling on two similar cases—Poonam Rani v. State of Uttar Pradesh, and Sultana Mirza v. State of Uttar Pradesh — Allahabad High Court held that the Constitutional Court is duty-bound to monitor and observe the constitutional morality as well as the rights of the citizens which are under threat only on account of the sexual orientation.

See also 

 LGBT rights in India
 Devu G v. State Of Kerala (2023) 
 S Sushma v. Commissioner of Police (2021)
 Navtej Singh Johar v. Union of India (2018)

References 

High Courts of India cases
Indian LGBT rights case law
LGBT rights in India
2021 in LGBT history
2021 in India